Haraguchi Kensai (2 April 1847 – 18 June 1919) was an Imperial Japanese Army (IJA) general and, in his later life, a member of the House of Peers.

Biography

Early life
Haraguchi was born on 2 April 1847 to a samurai-class family in the Mori region of Bungo Province (in present-day Ōita Prefecture), located on the island of Kyushu.

Military career
In 1870, Haraguchi entered the Imperial Japanese Army Academy to train as an officer, and in 1872 received a commission as a second lieutenant or sub-lieutenant. Later in his career, from August 1890 to April 1892, he was dispatched to the German Empire to further his military education, where he served from 1890 to 1891 under Prussian general Jakob Meckel in the 2nd Infantry Regiment stationed in Mainz.

Haraguchi fought for the IJA in the Satsuma Rebellion, and later became a battalion commander, and then deputy head and, thereafter, principal of the Toyama Military School. He served as chief of staff of the IJA 4th Division  at the end of the First Sino-Japanese War. He promoted to major general in 1897 and, in succession, commanded the 20th Infantry Brigade, the 1st Mixed Brigade deployed in Taiwan (see Taiwan under Japanese rule), and the 17th Infantry Brigade.

Following the Japanese occupation of Korea at the start of the Russo-Japanese War, Haraguchi commanded the newly established Korean Garrison Army from 11 March to 8 September 1904, when he was replaced by field marshal Hasegawa Yoshimichi. In July 1904, he declared martial law on key railroads and near telegraph lines in response to local unrest, writing the month prior to Minister of War Terauchi Masatake:

 

Afterwards, he served in the Imperial General Headquarters as chief of staff of the Inspectorate General of Military Training. He received a Palgwae royal medal in 1904. In January 1905, he attained the rank of lieutenant general, and soon thereafter assumed command of the newly raised, 14,000-strong IJA 13th Division, which he led during the invasion of Sakhalin. For his successful service in the war, he was conferred the title of baron (danshaku) on 21 September 1907.

Haraguchi continued to command the IJA 13th Division until 6 July 1906, when he was relieved by Seizō Okazaki. Haraguchi transitioned to the IJA reserve forces in November 1907, and fully retired from military service in 1914.

Later life
From 1910 to 1918, Haraguchi was a member of the House of Peers. He died on 18 June 1919.

References

Citations

Works cited
 
 
 
 

1847 births
1919 deaths
Imperial Japanese Army Academy alumni
Imperial Japanese Army officers
Japanese generals
Japanese military personnel of the Russo-Japanese War
Kazoku
Members of the House of Peers (Japan)
Military personnel from Ōita Prefecture
Japanese military personnel of the First Sino-Japanese War
People of the Satsuma Rebellion